Hasht Behesht, literally meaning "the Eight Heavens" in Persian, is a 17th-century pavilion in Isfahan, Iran.  It was built by order of Suleiman I, the eighth shah of Iran's Safavid Empire, and functioned mainly as a private pavilion. It is located in Isfahan's famous Charbagh Street. It was also the first modern school in Isfahan was called His Majesty's School (Madrese Homayouni).

Structure

As indicated on its name, the two-story pavilion of Hasht Behesht was built on the hasht-behesht plan, that is a type of floor plan consisting of a central hall surrounded by eight rooms. The building is of an octagonal shape, and has two main entrances. Four larger sides of it feature large balconies (iwans), under which some tall and thin wooden columns are raised.

The pavilion is decorated with mural paintings, perforated woodwork, prismatic mirrors, tilework, and plasterwork.

Gallery

See also

 Iranian Art Museum Garden

References

Bibliography
 
 

Buildings and structures in Isfahan
Historic house museums in Iran
Palaces in Iran
Persian gardens in Iran
1669 establishments in Iran
Houses completed in 1669
Safavid architecture